Beyond Darkness is an Italian horror film written and directed by Claudio Fragasso.

Plot 
A minister and his family move into a new house, without knowing that it was built over the place where twenty witches were burnt at the stake. Soon the terror begins, with the house terrorizing its inhabitants (a la Amityville Horror) with the elements that lie within the construction, for example; a possessed radio and a flying cleaver. The priest's young son is possessed by the demons of Hell, and he enlists the aid of another, more experienced priest to help him perform an exorcism on the boy, in a sequence very similar to that in The Exorcist. The spirit of a female serial killer also inhabits the house, an ugly baldheaded woman who was electrocuted by the state for murdering ten children and ingesting their souls inside herself. The twenty executed witches also reappear in the form of black shrouded ghosts as the exorcism proceeds.

Cast 
 David Brandon as George
 Barbara Bingham as Annie
 Gene LeBrock as Peter
 Michael Stephenson as Martin
 Theresa Walker as Carole
 Stephen Brown as Jonathan
 Mary Coulson as Bette

See also
 La Casa series - an Italian rebranding of several otherwise unrelated horror films, including Beyond Darkness.

References

Sources

External links 
 
 

Films directed by Claudio Fragasso
Films scored by Carlo Maria Cordio
Films set in the United States
Unofficial sequel films